Test of the Warlords is a 1984 adventure module for the Dungeons & Dragons roleplaying game. Its associated code is CM1 and is TSR's product number 9117. The adventure takes place in Norwold, which is located in the north east corner of the Known World on Mystara. This campaign contains elements of hack-and-slash adventure, political intrigue and full-scale war.

Plot summary
Test of the Warlords is a campaign setting with an adventure scenario in which dominions are being set up in the land of Norwold.

The fame of the player characters have earned them the right and title to run a realm of their own, under the supervision of the king of Norwold, a newly colonized region to the north of Mystara. But even from the start, with all the troubles of establishing your own pockets of civilization in as yet untamed wilderness, Norworld has become the center of attention in the struggle between two old enemies: The sorcerous empire of Alphatia and the war-mongering realm of Thyatis.

Publication history
CM1 Test of the Warlords was written by Douglas Niles, with a cover by Clyde Caldwell, and interior illustrations by Jeff Easley, and was published by TSR in 1984 as a 32-page booklet with an outer folder.

Reception

Table of Contents

Credits
 Douglas Niles: Design
 Tim Kilpin: Editing
 Clyde Caldwell: Cover art
 Jeff Easley: Interior art
 Ruth Hoyer: Graphic design
 Diesel: Maps

Notable nonplayer characters 
 King Ericall of Norworld: lawful 28th level fighter
 Lernal the Swill: neutral 6th level fighter
 King Yarrvik the Just: lawful 9th level fighter (Oceansend)
 Tarn Oakleaf: neutral 24th level druid
 Madiera the Counselor: lawful 21st level magic user
 Christina Marie Alanira: Neutral 25th level magic-user
 Alak Dool: chaotic 19th level magic user
 Sir Ernest Day: lawful 16th level fighter
 Rutger Dag: neutral 15th level fighter
 Sandralane of Glantri: lawful 16th level cleric
 Max the First: chaotic 15th level fighter
 Alissa Patrician: lawful 15th level fighter
 Longtooth: chaotic 20th level thief
 Mequisa, the Lawful:
 Bethidia, the Neutral:
 Chasandri, the Chaotic:

See also
 List of Dungeons & Dragons modules

References

External links
 
 The "CM" modules from The Acaeum

Dungeons & Dragons modules
Mystara
Role-playing game supplements introduced in 1984